Cho Soo-hyang (born January 21, 1991) is a South Korean actress.

Career 
Cho Soo-hyang won Actress of the Year Award for her role in the film Wild Flowers (2015) at the 19th Busan International Film Festival in 2014. 

She is noted for her performance in the Korean drama Who Are You: School 2015 (2015).

Filmography

Film

Television series

Music videos

Awards and nominations

References

External links 
 
 
 
 Cho Soo-hyang at UL Entertainment 
 

1991 births
Living people
21st-century South Korean actresses
South Korean child actresses
South Korean female models
South Korean film actresses
South Korean television actresses
Dongguk University alumni
People from Seoul